The Paducah & Louisville Railway  is a Class II railroad that operates freight service between Paducah and Louisville, Kentucky. The line is located entirely within the Commonwealth of Kentucky.

The  line was purchased from Illinois Central Gulf Railroad in August, 1986. The  main route runs between Paducah and Louisville with branch lines from Paducah to Kevil and Mayfield, Kentucky and another from Cecilia to Elizabethtown, Kentucky. The PAL interchanges with Burlington Northern Santa Fe (BNSF) and Canadian National (CN), formerly Illinois Central Railroad, in Paducah.  In Madisonville, the line interchanges with CSX Transportation (CSXT).  

In Louisville, the line interchanges with the Indiana Rail Road (INRD), CSX Transportation (CSXT) and Norfolk Southern (NS). Class III line connections are at Princeton with the Fredonia Valley Railroad (FVRR) and at Louisville with the Louisville and Indiana Railroad (LIRC). This is a huge improvement from the little amount of traffic and poor condition the line was in by the time the ICG had sold it. 

Today it is a big regional class II railroad connecting with four class I railroads (listed above), as well as the three shortline connections it makes which are also listed above. The railroad serves "many chemical plants and other manufacturing companies, several coal mines, numerous clay and stone quarries, lumber and propane distributors, farm [including a few large grain elevators] and mine equipment suppliers, warehouses, transloads, bulk terminals, riverports, and one military base."

The parent company of the PAL, P&L Transportation, also operates the Evansville Western Railway and the Appalachian and Ohio Railroad.

Current and former equipment

See also
Gravel Switch, Livingston County, Kentucky
List of Kentucky railroads

References

External links 

PAL official web site

Kentucky railroads
Regional railroads in the United States
Spin-offs of the Illinois Central Gulf Railroad
Railway companies established in 1986
1986 establishments in Kentucky